José Eugenio Ruiz Palacios (born 12 August 1961, in Seville), known as Quico, is a Spanish retired footballer who played as a central defender.

Football career
During his professional career, Quico played mainly for hometown club Real Betis. Arriving in the 1982–83 campaign, he made his La Liga debut on 31 October 1982 in a 0–1 home loss against RC Celta de Vigo, and quickly became a fan favourite although he rarely started (only seven league matches in his first three years combined); on 30 August 1987, he scored the 2–1 winner in the Seville derby at Sevilla FC, heading home in the 86th minute of the match.

Quico left Betis in 1988, with 81 first division appearances in which he netted six goals. He then played two seasons in the second division with Andalusia neighbours Recreativo de Huelva, starting in both years and being relegated in his second.

References

External links

Betisweb stats and bio 

1961 births
Living people
Footballers from Seville
Spanish footballers
Association football defenders
La Liga players
Segunda División players
Segunda División B players
Tercera División players
Real Betis players
Recreativo de Huelva players